Ni Luh Dharma Putri Marino (born 4 August 1993) is an Indonesian actress, model, and presenter of Italian-Balinese descent. She is the second debut actress to win the Citra Award for Best Actress in the film Posesif (2017) – after Christine Hakim in 1974 with Cinta Pertama (1973).

Marino is married to Indonesian actor and producer Chicco Jerikho. She is the older sister of the model and actress Sitha Marino.

Filmography

Film

Television

Webseries

Award and nomination

References

External links 

 
 

21st-century Indonesian actresses
Indonesian film actresses
Indonesian female models
People from Denpasar
Balinese people
Indonesian people of Italian descent
Living people
1993 births